Kabhi Saas Kabhi Bahu is a comedy series on DD National channel based on the 3 generations of Awasthi family, whose head Mallu lives with wife Sujata, son Viru and his wife Hema, grandson Mohit and his wife Kajal. Hema finds herself trapped as she is in the unenviable position of being a bahu and a saas at the same time. The show premiered on 2 April 2008.

Cast
 Sushmita Mukherjee as Hema Virendra Awasthi
 Sonica Handa as Kajal Mohit Awasthi/Kajri Sharma
 Shama Deshpande as Sujata Mallu Awasthi
 Vije Bhatia as Mohit Awasthi
 Abhijit Lahiri as Mallu Awasthi
 Iqbal Azad as Virender Awasthi aka Veeru
 Shivani Gosain as Shalini
 Mukesh Rawal

References

External links

DD National original programming
Indian comedy television series